i,i Tour is a concert tour by American band Bon Iver, in support of their fourth studio album i, i. The tour began on August 31, 2019 in Missoula, Montana, United States and is set to conclude on November 11, 2022 in Lisbon, Portugal.

Background
Bon Iver announced the North American autumn tour dates on June 3, 2019 with opening acts Feist, Sharon Van Etten, and Yo La Tengo. The band also announced Asian dates on September 17, 2019. First set of European dates was announced on September 10, 2019 and the second one on January 24, 2020.

Organization partnerships
Bon Iver, through their campaign 2ABillion, partnered with local organizations to fight gender inequity and to end domestic and sexual violence during the tour. In 2019, Bon Iver managed to collect more than $185,000 for their partners through the initiative.

Here are the local organizations partnered with 2ABillion, to date:

Missoula — Make Your Move
Vail — Bright Future Foundation
Morrison — Girls Rock Denver
Salt Lake City — Utah Domestic Violence Coalition
George — SAGE Wenatchee
Vancouver — West Coast LEAF
Portland — Women's Foundation of Oregon
San Francisco — W.O.M.A.N. Inc.
Inglewood — Surviving In Numbers
Saint Paul — Casa de Esperanza
Rosemont — Resilience
Toronto — Shelter Movers
Columbus — BRAVO
Philadelphia — Women's Way
Brooklyn — Day One
Boston — Mass NOW
Washington, D.C. — DC SAFE and DASH
Raleigh — InterAct
Seoul — Korea Sexual Violence Relief Center
Bangkok — Freedom Restoration Project
Singapore — AWARE
Jakarta — Hollaback! Jakarta
Tokyo — Voice Up Japan

Set list
This set list is from the concert on October 15, 2019 in Boston. It is not intended to represent all tour dates.

"iMi"
"We"
"Holyfields,"
"Perth"
"666 ʇ"
"715 - CREEKS"
"U (Man Like)"
"Jelmore"
"Faith"
"Marion"
"Towers"
"Blood Bank"
"Flume"
"Lump Sum"
"Holocene"
"Salem"
"Hey, Ma"
"Skinny Love"
"Sh'Diah"
"Naeem"

Encore
"45_"
"33 “GOD”"
"RABi"

Tour dates

Box office score data

Notes

References

2019 concert tours
2020 concert tours
2021 concert tours
2022 concert tours